.Wav Theory (sometimes stylized as .WAV Theory) is a mixtape by American rapper Towkio. It was released on April 28, 2015. It includes production from Kaytranada and Lido, as well as guest appearances from Vic Mensa and Chance the Rapper. Music videos were created for "I Know You", "Free Your Mind", ".Wav Theory", "Reflection", and "Clean Up".

Critical reception

Matthew Strauss of Pitchfork gave the mixtape a 6.2 out of 10, writing, "Towkio's nebulousness leaves .Wav Theory as an enjoyable album that asks few questions and gives few answers." Adam Kivel of Consequence of Sound gave the mixtape a C+ grade, commenting that it is full of "energetic, fun tracks with middling verses."

It was placed at number 27 on Complexs "Best Albums of 2015" list, number 13 on RedEyes "20 Best Albums of 2015" list, and number 9 on Chicago Tribunes "Top 10 Chicago Indie Albums of 2015" list.

Track listing

References

External links
 
 

2015 mixtape albums
Hip hop albums by American artists
Albums produced by Kaytranada